José Luis Torero FREng FTSE FRSE FRSN (born in Lima, Peru) is the Head of the Department of Civil, Environmental and Geomatic Engineering at University College London. He took this appointment after two years (2017-2019) as the John L. Bryan Chair in the Department of Fire Protection Engineering and Director of the Center for Disaster Resilience in the Department of Civil and Environmental Engineering at the University of Maryland (USA). He was formerly the Head of the School of Civil Engineering at the University of Queensland (2012-2017). He is Fellow of the Royal Academy of Engineering (UK) since 2010, the Australian Academy of Technological Sciences and Engineering since 2014 and The Royal Society of Edinburgh (UK) since 2008. He held the BRE/RAE Chair in Fire Safety Engineering and directed the BRE Centre for Fire Safety Engineering from 2004 to 2012. In 2018 he was elected a Fellow of the Royal Society of New South Wales, being gazetted in the NSW Government Gazette (No 8, Thursday 31 January 2019) by the then Governor of New South Wales (now Governor General of Australia) His Excellency General, the Honourable David Hurley AC DSC(Rtd).

He was co-chair of Fire Safety at the Council on Tall Buildings and Urban Habitat from 2009 to 2015.

He was the Editor-in-Chief of Fire Safety Journal  (2010 - 2016) and a member of the editorial board member of numerous journals including Fire Technology, and Progress in Energy and Combustion Science.

Research 
Torero has contributed mainly to the fields of combustion and fire sciences. His research work is in fire dynamics, flame spread, smouldering, combustion in microgravity, smoke detection, protection and suppression systems, and professional education in fire safety engineering. Since moving to Edinburgh in 2001 he has developed expertise in the behaviour of structures in fire and the use of combustion to remediate contaminated land. While at the University of Queensland, Jose worked with NASA to conduct large-scale spacecraft fire safety tests, as part of the SAFFIRE programme.  

He has received several awards that include the Tam Dalyell science prize (2010), Lord Ezra Award by the Combustion Engineering Association (2009), the Arthur B. Guise Medal from the Society of Fire Protection Engineers (2008), Bodycote Warrington Fire Research Prize (2007), FM Global Award at the 5th Fire and Explosions Hazard International Seminar (2007), William M. Carey (2001) and Harry C. Bigglestone (2001) best paper awards, the Lilly-Center for Teaching Excellence (1996) and E. Robert Kent (1998) Outstanding Teaching awards and honorary membership to the Salamander Fire Protection Engineering Society.

Torero has served as a consultant to numerous organisations around the world. He has been an invited researcher at NIST, at the University of Texas at Austin, the University of California at Berkeley, the University of Bremen, the Catholic University of Santiago (Chile), the Instituto Nacional de Tecnica Aeroespacial (INTA, Spain), and the Universities of Poitiers, Bourges, Ecole de Mines de Saint Etienne and Aix-Marseille (France) . In 2011 he held the Landolt & Cia. Chair in Innovations for a Sustainable Future at the Ecole Polytechnique Fédérale de Lausanne.

He was appointed as technical expert on the United Nations Committee on Enforced Disappearances (CED) investigation into the Iguala Mass Kidnapping. Torero's research and subsequent report proved crucial in disproving the "Historic Truth" put forward by the Mexican Authorities.

Career 
Torero is currently the Head of the Department of Civil, Environmental and Geomatic Engineering at University College London. He took this appointment after serving for two years (2017-2019) at the University of Maryland as the John L. Bryan Chair of the Department of Fire Protection Engineering in the A. James Clark School of Engineering, and the Director of the Center for Disaster Resilience within the school's Department of Civil and Environmental Engineering. Torero moved to the Clark School from the University of Queensland in Australia, where he chaired the School of Civil Engineering. Prior to that, he held the BRE Trust/Royal Academy of Engineering Chair in Fire Safety Engineering at the University of Edinburgh and worked as an associate professor at UMD's Department of Fire Protection Engineering. Torero has also served as Chargé de Recherche at the French National Centre for Scientific Research. He obtained his PhD in 1992 from the University of California, Berkeley, where he studied smoldering combustion and fire safety (Doctoral adviser Carlos Fernández-Pello). He graduated with a B.S. in Mechanical Engineering from Pontificia Universidad Católica del Perú.

References

External links
 University of Edinburgh's Fire Safety Engineering webpage
 Christmas Lecture: Prof Jose Torero - Fire: A story of fascination, familiarity and fear

Peruvian emigrants to the United Kingdom
Fire prevention
Fire protection
Living people
UC Berkeley College of Engineering alumni
Academics of the University of Edinburgh
Peruvian academics
Academic staff of the University of Queensland
Fellows of the Royal Academy of Engineering
Fellows of the Royal Society of Edinburgh
University of Maryland, College Park faculty
Year of birth missing (living people)
Pontifical Catholic University of Peru alumni